The bending stiffness is the resistance of a member against bending deformation. It is a function of the Young's modulus , the second moment of area  of the beam cross-section about the axis of interest, length of the beam and beam boundary condition. Bending stiffness of a beam can analytically be derived from the equation of beam deflection when it is applied by a force.

According to elementary beam theory, the relationship between the applied bending moment  and the resulting curvature  of the beam is:

Double integration of the above equation leads to computing the deflection of the beam, and in turn, the bending stiffness of the beam.
Bending stiffness in beams is also known as Flexural rigidity.

See also
 Applied mechanics
 Beam theory
 Bending
Stiffness

External links
 Efunda's beam calculator

Continuum mechanics
Structural analysis